South Africa has competed in all but eight of the 22 Commonwealth Games which have been held; from the original Games in 1930 to 1958, and then from 1994 onwards.

Because of South Africa's then apartheid policy, South Africa was sanctioned from the British Commonwealth in 1961, but was later re-admitted in 1994 following the end of apartheid.

As of 2022, South Africa ranks at number 6 on the all-time medal table with 137 gold, 132 silver and 147 bronze, respectively.

Medal tally

See also

South Africa at the 2006 Commonwealth Games
:Category:Commonwealth Games competitors for South Africa

References

External links
SASCOC

 
South Africa and the Commonwealth of Nations
Nations at the Commonwealth Games